Thi Kyar Say Thet Thay Nhyun is a 1964 Burmese black-and-white drama film, directed by Thukha starring Win Oo, Wah Wah Win Shwe, Than Aung  and Khin Than Nu.

Cast
Win Oo
Wah Wah Win Shwe
Than Aung
Khin Than Nu
Zeya
Myint Myint Htay
Kyauk Lone
Than Nwet

References

1964 films
1960s Burmese-language films
Burmese drama films
Films shot in Myanmar
1964 drama films